This is an overview of active and former artists signed to Sympathy for the Record Industry.

Active Roster
 The Dwarves
 El Vez
 Helen Love
 April March
 The Muffs
 Scarling.
 Veruca Salt
 The Willowz

Selected Passive/Defunct/Alumnus Roster
 The 5.6.7.8's
 Acid King
 Bad Religion
 Billy Childish
 The Detroit Cobras
 The Electrocutes
 Roky Erickson
 Gas Huffer
 Geraldine Fibbers
 The Gizmos
 The Gun Club
 Holly Golightly
 Hole
 Hot Snakes
 Jack Off Jill
 Lubricated Goat
 Man or Astro-man?
 Redd Kross
 Reigning Sound
 Rocket From The Crypt
 The Scientists
 Sonic Boom
 Southern Culture on the Skids
 Spacemen 3
 Suicide
 Turbonegro
 The Upholsterers (Jack White's side project)
 The Von Bondies
 Whirlwind Heat
 The White Stripes

See also
 Sympathy for the Record Industry

Sympathy for the Record Industry